John Blackwood (31 August 1877 – 4 January 1913) was a Scottish footballer who played as a centre forward in the Scottish League for Celtic and Partick Thistle, in the Football League for Woolwich Arsenal, and in the Southern League for Reading, Queens Park Rangers and West Ham United.

Career
Blackwood started his career with Petershill and joined Scottish First Division club Celtic on 23 September 1899. He and Willie McOustra were signed by the club after playing in a friendly against The Kaffirs, a touring team from the Orange Free State. After a single appearance, he was loaned to Partick Thistle of the Second Division the following month. He made his debut for Thistle in November, replacing Willie Paul in the forward line in a 2–0 win over Airdrieonians, and scored his first goals later in the month, against Morton. In December, he scored twice, the first in the opening minute, in an 8–1 win against Linthouse. He continued to score goals for Thistle into the new year, with eight goals in two friendlies against Clachnacuddin and Orion, and a hat-trick against St Mirren in the Western League. He had been due to play in the Scottish Cup first round match against Galston on 13 January 1900. The club had arranged with the Caledonian Railway for the train carrying the team to stop at Gorbals to pick up Blackwood and William Goudie, but it did not stop. He did feature twice in the competition, scoring once, and scored seven goals in eight appearances for Thistle in the league. At the end of the season, Blackwood was recalled by Celtic, who then sold him to Football League Second Division club Woolwich Arsenal.

After joining Woolwich Arsenal in May 1900, Blackwood scored on his debut, in a 2–1 win over Gainsborough Trinity on the opening day of the 1900–01 season. This was to be his only season with the club; he scored six goals in 17 league appearances. He also scored during his one appearance in the FA Cup, against Darwen on 5 January 1901. He left for Reading in May 1901.

In November 1902, Blackwood joined Queens Park Rangers. He made 15 Southern League First Division appearances during the 1902–03 season, scoring nine goals. He also played and scored in the first round of the Southern Professional Charity Cup, against Luton Town, and featured in seven Western League matches, scoring two, and three London League games, scoring once. The following season, he scored 18 goals in 24 Southern League appearances, with returns of three goals in six appearances in the Western League, and two goals in six appearances in the London League.

He joined fellow Southern League First Division club West Ham United in December 1904. Taking over centre forward duties from Billy Bridgeman, he scored on his debut, against Portsmouth on 26 December, but his four-match run in the team coincided with one of the club's worst ever losing streaks. He played the last of his games for West Ham on 7 January 1905, against his old club QPR, after which Bridgeman was recalled to the team. After leaving the Irons, he returned to Scotland, joining Royal Albert on 2 September 1905.

Career statistics

Notes

References

1877 births
1913 deaths
Footballers from Glasgow
Scottish footballers
Association football forwards
Petershill F.C. players
Celtic F.C. players
Partick Thistle F.C. players
Arsenal F.C. players
Reading F.C. players
Queens Park Rangers F.C. players
West Ham United F.C. players
Royal Albert F.C. players
Scottish Football League players
English Football League players
Southern Football League players